Saint Peter of Nora is a Roman Catholic Pre-Romanesque church, located in Las Regueras, Asturias, Spain, beside the Nora river, about 12 km from Oviedo. The church is recorded for the first time in a donation document of Alfonso III of Asturias in 905.

Given its similarities with the church of San Julián de los Prados and the church of Santa María de Bendones, it was probably built in the times of Alfonso II of Asturias. Declared National Monument in 1931, the church burnt in 1936 during the Spanish Civil War losing the roof. It was  restored by Luis Menéndez Pidal y Alvarez.

Architecture 
This church has the construction style established in church of San Julián de los Prados: facing eastwards, vestibule separate from the main structure, basilica-type ground plan, central nave higher than the side aisles, with intersecting wooden roof and lit by Windows with stone lattice. The straight sanctuary is divided into three apses with barrel vaults. As a differentiating element, the apses were joined to each other through the dividing walls by semicircular-arched doors. Like all the churches from this period, there was a room over the apse, only accessible from outside through a trefoil window. The bell tower, separate from the church like in Santa María de Bendones, does not belong to the original construction, and stems from an initiative in the seventies by the architect and great restorer of Asturian Pre-Romanesque, Luis Menéndez Pidal y Alvarez.

See also 
Asturian architecture
Catholic Church in Spain

References 

 

9th-century churches in Spain
Pedro de Nova
Pre-Romanesque architecture in Asturias
Bien de Interés Cultural landmarks in Asturias